Ivy League is a style of men's dress, popular during the late 1950s in the Northeastern United States, and said to have originated on college campuses, particularly those of the Ivy League. It was the predecessor to the preppy style of dress.

Origins

Ivy League dress is characterized by a clean cut but overall less formal style than that of previous (“Trad”) generations. The style originated among students at elite American universities and is mainly derived from the casual and sporting attire worn by the British and American upper classes during the 1920s for pursuits such as golf, polo, sailing, rugby football, hunting, and tennis. The sport coat, blazer, oxford shirt, and chino trouser, among others, all originated in the early 20th century as sportswear but found acceptance as everyday attire in Ivy League-style circles. Trendsetters such as the Prince of Wales combined the latest American fashions with traditional British country clothing such as brogue boots, Argyle socks and jumpers (sweaters), tweed cloth sportcoats, Irish walking hats and plus fours in houndstooth, herringbone, or the Prince of Wales check popularized by Edward VII.

During the mid to late 1950s, many young college men adopted the Ivy League look due to its association with the upper classes at leisure. The clothing stores J. Press and Brooks Brothers represented perhaps the quintessential Ivy League dress manner, the former with two of its four locations found at Harvard and Yale universities (the Princeton branch closed in 1943).  

The Ivy League style was epitomized by the "sack" suit.  The sack suit jacket (and similarly styled blazers and sport coats) featured a "3-to-2" or "three roll two" (3 buttons with the top button "rolled" on the back side of the lapel, effectively leaving only two usable buttons) front closure, no front darts, and a single "hooked" vent (or "slit") at the back.  The cut of the jacket was boxier and less form-fitting than traditional business suits.  The trousers typically had a lower (but not low by modern standards) rise, were held up by a belt rather than suspenders, and were frequently not pleated. Button-down collar shirts, usually with a breast pocket, would frequently be worn with both suits and sport jackets in lieu of more formal dress shirts and penny loafers or derby shoes would be worn rather than oxford shoes. In suits, the Ivy League style was promoted by Brooks Brothers and included natural shoulder single-breasted suit jackets. In 1957 and 1958, about 70% of all suits sold were in the "Ivy League" style. 

Typical hairstyles included the crew cut, Harvard clip, and regular haircut, and common clothing items included cardigan sweaters, sweater vests, Nantucket reds, khaki chino pants, knitted ties, white Oxford shirts, Tootal or Brooks Brothers ties, Ascot neckties, tartan, grey tweed cloth or flannel sportcoats, and seersucker blazers in the South.

Mainstream popularity and decline

From the late 1950s until the mid 1960s, Ivy League clothing was considered desirable mainstream apparel for middle class adults in the US. In Britain during the mid and late 60s, the Mod subculture combined the latest Italian fashions with the attire worn by the heroes in contemporary American films such as Steve McQueen, James Dean or Paul Newman. Particularly popular were the grey flannel, Tonic, or houndstooth suits, polo shirts, chino pants, Argyle socks, sweater vests, cardigan sweaters, basketweave loafers, Madras plaid, and narrow brimmed Irish walking hats and Trilbys. 

The style remained fashionable in the United States until it was supplanted (at least, for young men) at the tail end of the decade by the wide lapels, flared slacks, and brighter colors of the Peacock Revolution, as well as the casual clothing of the hippie counterculture during the late 1960s and early 1970s.

Revival

Today the line between Ivy and preppy style is somewhat blurred but preppy style tends to be more colorful, especially in spring and summer, and incorporates more casual chic attire. It was first popularized in the early 1980s as a return to Ivy League styles after a decade of more modern trends, but today, preppy differs from historic Ivy League. Preppy fashion is influenced by traditional collegiate trends, rather than reproducing them exactly, and various clothing items can be considered preppy based on how they are worn or accented. During the 1990s and 2000s, Polo Ralph Lauren, J. Crew, and Vineyard Vines were large marketers of preppy clothing, modernized to accommodate new trends inspired by indie pop and urban fashion. Controversially, in a recently revised form, a version of this style is sometimes promoted and marketed as "American Trad" or simply "Trad," although there are marked differences between the two styles. Trad is narrower in scope than the intermediate preppy style.

By the 2010s, many American preps opted to dress in a more classic, tailored style closer to the original Ivy League look. 

Popular items include loafers, Sperry Top-Sider boat shoes, Aran sweaters, cardigans, Oxford shirts, Cricket pullovers, wingtips, stripy polo shirts, khaki or pastel colored Vineyard Vines, Nantucket Reds, white or bright pastel color socks, colored jeans, baseball jackets, khaki cargo shorts, and tapered chinos. Blazers, especially those made from seersucker, had made a comeback as informal or smart casual wear by the mid 2010s, and the traditional two button style was updated with throwback styling inspired by The Great Gatsby.

In popular culture
During the 1950s, the wealthy and clean cut Squares, Rahs and Socs (Soc being short for social) with their Ivy League clothes were the rivals to the working class Greaser subculture. The conflict between the two groups features in Grease, The Outsiders, Indiana Jones and the Kingdom of the Crystal Skull, and Cry-Baby. In a scene in The Godfather, set in 1946, Michael Corleone is derided as an unlikely assassin because he is a "college boy" who wears an "Ivy League suit." The style was parodied in Clark Gesner's song The Ivy League Look from the 1957-58 Princeton Triangle Club musical "After A Fashion".

See also
Take Ivy
Jock
Preppy
Popular clique
Subcultures of the 1950s

Notes

Further reading 

 Articles of Interest, a podcast whose third season focuses on Ivy League

Fashion aesthetics
2000s fashion
1950s fashion